9260 Edwardolson, provisional designation , is a Florian binary asteroid from the inner regions of the asteroid belt, approximately 4.1 kilometers in diameter. It was discovered on 8 October 1953, by Indiana University during its Indiana Asteroid Program at Goethe Link Observatory in Brooklyn, Indiana, United States. It was named for American astronomer Edward Olson.

Classification and orbit 

Edwardolson is a member of the Flora family, one of the largest families of stony asteroids. It orbits the Sun in the inner main-belt at a distance of 1.8–2.8 AU once every 3 years and 6 months (1,266 days). Its orbit has an eccentricity of 0.23 and an inclination of 5° with respect to the ecliptic. As no precoveries were taken, the asteroid's observation arc begins with its official discovery observation in 1953.

Diameter, albedo and rotation 

A rotational lightcurve of Edwardolson was obtained from photometric observations in several locations including the Slovakian Skalnaté pleso Observatory. It rendered a rotation period of  hours with a low brightness variation of 0.11 in magnitude, which suggests that the body has a nearly spheroidal shape. According to the survey carried out by the NEOWISE mission of NASA's Wide-field Infrared Survey Explorer, the asteroid has an albedo of 0.26 and 0.16, and an respective absolute magnitude of 14.0 and 14.54. Both data sets converge to a diameter of 4.1 kilometers.

Moon 

A minor-planet moon orbiting Edwardolson was discovered in 2005, making it a binary system.

Naming 

This minor planet was named in honor of American astronomer Edward C. Olson (born 1930) of the University of Illinois whose observations explained the distortion of the outer layers of mass-gaining stars, and how their rotation can come close to the stability limit during the involved mass-transfer process and the preserved angular momentum. Olson was also an active member of the International Astronomical Union, affiliated with its Division G Stars and Stellar Physics. The approved naming citation was published by the Minor Planet Center on 13 July 2004.

Notes

References

External links 
 Asteroids with Satellites, Robert Johnston, johnstonsarchive.net
 Asteroid Lightcurve Database (LCDB), query form (info )
 Dictionary of Minor Planet Names, Google books
 Asteroids and comets rotation curves, CdR – Observatoire de Genève, Raoul Behrend
 Discovery Circumstances: Numbered Minor Planets (5001)-(10000) – Minor Planet Center
 
 

Flora asteroids
Discoveries by Indiana University (Indiana Asteroid Program)
Edwardolson
Binary asteroids
19531008